Crate Day is an unofficial holiday in New Zealand,  held on the first Saturday of December. The day consists of drinking a crate of twelve 745 ml beer bottles from 12pm until 12am the next day. 

Crate Day was the inspiration for Truly Friday's hit single 'Crate Day'.

The unofficial holiday was originally created by The Rock radio station in 2010. There are several “commandments” that The Rock established for the day, such as participants supporting "Thy crate of origin", referring to drinking beer made in an individual's birthplace, and "Thou only beef that should attend National Crate Day is thy beef for thy BBQ". The event has grown in popularity since its creation, leading to a number of arrests and injuries. Many alcohol-related business have promotions for the event and numerous local councils enact liquor bans during the weekend.

See also 
 List of unofficial observances in New Zealand

References

Unofficial observances
Observances in New Zealand